Eremophila ballythunnensis is a flowering plant in the figwort family, Scrophulariaceae and is endemic to Western Australia. It is a small, spreading shrub with narrow oval leaves and mauve-purple flowers with densely hairy sepals.

Description
The 4 stamens are enclosed by the petal tube. Flowering time is mainly from June to August.

Taxonomy and naming
Eremophila ballythunnensis was first formally described by Bevan Buirchell and Andrew Brown in 2016 and the description was published in Nuytsia. The specific epithet (ballythunnensis) refers to "Ballythunna" Station where it was first seen.

Distribution and habitat
This eremophila is found in the Murchison biogeographic region growing in shallow soil on rocky quartzite hills with Acacia and other Eremophila species.

Conservation status
Eremophila ballythunnensis has been classified as "Priority One" by the Government of Western Australia Department of Parks and Wildlife, meaning that it is known from only one or a few locations which are potentially at risk.

References

ballythunnensis
Eudicots of Western Australia
Plants described in 2016